Kevin Fagan is the name of:
 Kevin Fagan (cartoonist) (born 1956), American cartoonist, creator of the syndicated comic strip Drabble
 Kevin Fagan (doctor) (1909–1992), Australian doctor and World War II hero
 Kevin Fagan (American football) (born 1963), former defensive end for the San Francisco 49ers